APCO Worldwide is an independent global public affairs and strategic communications consultancy. With 680 employees in 35 worldwide locations, it is also the fifth largest independently owned PR firm in the United States. Headquartered in Washington, D.C., APCO was founded in 1984 by Margery Kraus, who is now the firm's Executive Chairman.

APCO focuses on handling sensitive political and crisis management issues. Many APCO executives are former government officials, politicians, and ambassadors. APCO's clientele consists of multi-national corporations, governments, politicians, associations, and nonprofit organizations.

History
Margery Kraus founded APCO Associates in 1984 as a subsidiary to Arnold & Porter, one of Washington's largest law firms, and from where APCO's name is derived. Grey Global Group, a New Yorkbased global advertising and marketing agency, purchased majority ownership of APCO in 1991 from Arnold & Porter. On September 28, 2004, APCO announced its independent buyout from Grey Global and has thus become one of the largest privately owned public relations firms in the world. The firm has been described by Public Relations media outlet Everything-PR as "one of the world's most powerful PR firms."

In 2016, Kraus stepped down from her role as CEO, for the role to be filled by Brad Staples, who is a member of the London office. When speaking to PR Week, Staples indicated that APCO was looking to create a 'global account leadership initiative', whereby global accounts were being run by senior members of the team based in Europe, rather than the United States.

In February 2020, APCO Worldwide announced an agreement to a partnership with Erie Street, a Chicago-based advisory firm. APCO declined to disclose financial terms but has confirmed that the partnership will not affect ownership or staffing at either firm.

Notable work
APCO handled the crisis for Merck & Co's withdrawal of Vioxx from the market. Kazakhstan's president, Nursultan Nazarbayev hired APCO to extricate himself from a four-year-long dispute with his former son-in-law Rakhat Aliyev.

WorldCom hired APCO Worldwide to handle its political PR surrounding the media frenzy regarding its disclosure that £2.4bn in expenses had been falsely reported in its financial results in 2002.

APCO also promoted and rebranded the Gujarat Global Investors' Summit in India, the showpiece investment meeting of the then chief minister and current prime minister, Narendra Modi as "Vibrant Gujarat".

APCO Worldwide is the lead management agency for the American Pavilion at the Astana Expo 2017. The USA Pavilion received nearly a half million visitors.  The US Kazakhstan Business Association recognized Margery Kraus for taking on the pavilion management for Astana EXPO 2017.

Awards 
APCO's Maggie Brown received the CleanTech Alliance Chairman’s Award in 2017.

Controversy

The Advancement of Sound Science Coalition controversy
The "Sound Science Coalition" (TASSC) was created in 1993 by Phillip Morris and APCO in response to a 1992 United States Environmental Protection Agency (EPA) report which identified secondhand smoke as a Group A human carcinogen. TASSC developed local coalitions to influence media, legislators, and the public, and recruited scientists and researchers to support Philip Morris's position. Nonetheless, TASSC described itself as "a not-for-profit coalition advocating the use of sound science in public policy decision making." TASSC's links to the tobacco industry were minimized as part of APCO's strategy for TASSC to appear to be an independent national grassroots coalition. To conceal this relationship, TASSC broadened their focus to question other scientific topics, notable among them global warming.

Malaysia
On March 30, 2010, Malaysian opposition leader Anwar Ibrahim alleged in the Malaysian parliament (the Dewan Rakyat) that the 1Malaysia concept was mirrored after "One Israel" concept and designed by Mindteams Sdn Bhd, a branch in Malaysia of APCO Worldwide.  He alleged that APCO also created the One Israel concept in 1999 for then Israeli's Prime Minister Ehud Barak. Both APCO and the Barisan Nasional government stated that Anwar's allegation was untrue. Malaysian lawmakers have tabled a motion to censure Anwar for misleading the Parliament over his 1Malaysia-One Israel allegations which were passed by the Parliament on April 22, 2010.

HP controversy
In 2010, APCO was involved in the controversial recommendation to fire Mark Hurd, the CEO of Hewlett-Packard (HP). Kent Jarrell, a senior vice president, wrote a mock news story which he showed to HP's board. During this same meeting, he contemplated that HP would negatively be affected by bad press of its CEO being involved in an inappropriate relationship with an ex-soft porn actress, Jodie Fisher.

References

External links
 Official website

Public relations companies based in Washington, D.C.
Public relations companies of the United States